{{DISPLAYTITLE:C21H30O5}}
The molecular formula C21H30O5 (molar mass: 362.46 g/mol, exact mass: 362.209324) may refer to:

 Cortisol, a corticosteroid
 5α-Dihydroaldosterone
 Dihydrocortisone
 Hydrocortisone
 Humulone
 18-Hydroxycorticosterone
 Isohumulone